The Minstrel Show is a 1932 short animated film by Columbia Pictures starring the comic strip character Krazy Kat.

Plot
Krazy is a stage actor who leads a group of performers wearing blackface. The stage acts include playing musical instruments, dancing, and telling jokes.

After a few acts, one of the performers does some scat singing. The audience, however, does not find the performance appealing as they slingshot a slice of watermelon into the performer's mouth, thus changing his singing style. The audience finds it more fun to toss things are they hurl more fruits onto the performers.

When Krazy does his second solo act, the audience slingshoots a large can of tomatoes at him. Krazy does not seem bothered by the deed as he turns the can into a kilt, and the can's contents into bagpipes. Once more, the audience tosses another object onto the stage. This time, an egg. The egg lands on Krazy's head, knocking him unconscious, before dropping onto the stage floor where it breaks open. Strangely, a skunk emerges from the eggshell. The skunk unleashes fumes, causing everybody at the theater to leave. Krazy wakes up but is still dazed from the egg projectile.

See also
 Krazy Kat filmography

References

External links
The Minstrel Show at The Big Cartoon DataBase

1932 short films
American animated short films
American black-and-white films
1932 animated films
Krazy Kat shorts
Columbia Pictures short films
1930s American animated films
Columbia Pictures animated short films
Screen Gems short films